Yugoslavia was present at the Eurovision Song Contest 1971, held in Dublin, Ireland.

Before Eurovision

Jugovizija 1971 
The Yugoslav national final to select their entry, was held on 20 February at the Komunalni center Hall in Domžale. The hosts were Helena Koder and Ljubo Jelčić. There were 9 songs in the final, from three subnational public broadcasters. RTV Sarajevo and RTV Belgrade did not submit any songs that year. The winner was chosen by the votes of 10 juries in five cities and towns in each Yugoslav Republic, a total of 400 jurors. The winning song was "Tvoj dječak je tužan" performed by the Croatian singer Krunoslav Slabinac, written by Zvonimir Golob and composed by Ivan Krajač. He previously came 7th in the 1970 Yugoslav Final.

At Eurovision
Krunoslav Slabinac performed 15th on the night of the contest, following Portugal and preceding Finland. At the close of the voting the song had received 58 points, coming 14th in the field of 18 competing countries.

Voting

Notes

References

External links
Eurodalmatia official ESC club
Eurovision Song Contest National Finals
Eurovision France
ECSSerbia.com
OGAE North Macedonia

1971
Countries in the Eurovision Song Contest 1971
Eurovision